Ficus subpisocarpa (called 笔管榕 in China and 雀榕 in Taiwan) is a species of small deciduous tree native to Japan, China, Taiwan and southeast Asia to the Moluccas (Ceram). Two subspecies are recognised. Ants predominantly of the genus Crematogaster have been recorded living in stem cavities. Ficus subpisocarpa is pollinated by Platyscapa ishiiana (Agaonidae).

Taxonomy
French botanist François Gagnepain described Ficus subpisocarpa in 1927, from a collection near Haiphong in Vietnam. It was reduced to a synonym of F. superba variety japonica by E. J. H. Corner in 1965, before being raised to species status again by Cornelis Christiaan Berg in 2005. Two subspecies are recognised. 
Within the genus, Ficus subpisocarpa belongs in the banyan subgenus Urostigma section Urostigma subsection Urostigma.

Description
The bark is dark brown, while the branches are reddish brown to dark grey. The tree is deciduous. They are spirally arranged on the stem. The growth of new tissue occurs when a whole section of the branch undergoes budding and becomes covered with leaves. The figs are ramiflorous, that is they grow on the branches, in groups of one to three. There is a high variation in color between trees and seasons; mature figs are whitish pink to dark purple, and are bulbous in shape and measure  in diameter. Two to four crops of figs can be produced in a year.

Subspecies pubipoda is distinguished by having the base of the petiole covered in white fur.

Distribution and habitat
The nominate subspecies is found from Southern Japan, Taiwan, Hainan and eastern China (where it occurs in Fujian, Guangdong, Guangxi, southern Yunnan and southeastern Zhejiang provinces), through Vietnam, Laos and Thailand into Indonesia where it reaches Ceram in the Moluccas. It is possibly found in Cambodia. Subspecies pubipoda is found in Vietnam, Cambodia, Thailand and Peninsular Malaysia.

Ecology
In a field study in Taiwan, ants were found to inhabit cavities within internodes of young branches of Ficus subpisocarpa. They feed on wasps, more commonly on non-pollinating rather than the pollinating species necessary for the fig to reproduce. It is possible that the fig developed the cavities to accommodate the ants. 75% of ants recorded in the study belonged to the genus Crematogaster, with the remainder belonging to the genera Technomyrmex, Myrmica and Prenolepis. Sometimes two ant species shared the cavities. The ants appear to tend aphids and scale insects that are present on the fig plant.
Ficus subpisocarpa is the second Ficus species observed with ants inhabiting branch cavities, the first observation was done in Borneo on Ficus obscura var. borneensis.

References

subpisocarpa
Trees of China
Trees of Indo-China
Trees of Japan
Trees of the Maluku Islands
Trees of Peninsular Malaysia
Trees of Taiwan